The Halton Mayfly was a British two-seat biplane designed by C.H. Latimer-Needham and built by the Halton Aero Club between 1926 and 1927. Registered G-EBOO and named the HAC.1 Mayfly it first flew on 31 January 1927. It was converted to a single-seater and was flown in a number of air races including the King's Cup Race. It was entered in the 1926 Lympne light aircraft trials as No. 8 but failed to arrive in time for the elimination trials.

By 1928 the aircraft had been converted from a biplane to a parasol monoplane and was renamed the Halton HAC.2 Minus. It was used again for air racing, being entered in the 1928 and 1928 King's Cup Races. The aircraft was dismantled at Halton in 1930.

Variants
HAC.1 Mayfly
Two-seat then single-seat biplane powered by a Bristol Cherub III engine.
HAC.2 Minus
The Mayfly converted into a parasol monoplane.

Specifications (Mayfly)

References

Notes

Bibliography

1920s British sport aircraft
Aircraft first flown in 1927
Biplanes
Single-engined tractor aircraft